Baid or BAID may refer to:

 Barrow Area Information Database, a database supporting arctic science
 Beaux-Arts Institute of Design, a former art and architecture school in New York City
 The BioAssay identification number, an identifying number for chemical compounds used by the PubChem database
 Chandan Mal Baid, a leader of the Indian National Congress